Cold, Cold Heart is a British post rock band. Their music is composed and performed by multi-instrumentalists Robert Manning, Chris Daniel, Gareth Jones and Alex Wilson. The band typically compose lengthy, cinematic guitar-based instrumental pieces.

They made their UK national radio debut with Gideon Coe on BBC Radio 6 Music, and were subsequently featured on Amazing Radio and WFUV. The band's debut album, How the Other Half Live and Die, was released on 12 March 2016 on Fluttery Records, as exclusively reported by Coe on his BBC show. In 2018, Cold, Cold Heart returned with an EP called Arch, released on 17 May 2018 once again on Fluttery Records.

Discography

Singles
"Stand/still" (2014)
"Wolf Eyes, You're Staring" (2014)
"Megan" (2015)
"Wake Up in Blue" (2017)
"Katie, My Queen" (2019)

Albums
How the Other Half Live and Die (2016)

EPs
Arch (2018)

Band members

 Robert Manning 
 Chris Daniel 
 Gareth Jones 
 Alex Wilson

contributors
 Simone Potter - viola 
 Bethany Pozzi-Johnson - vocals 
 Mary Leay - vocals

See also
List of post-rock bands

References

External links
Cold, cold heart on Soundcloud
Queen Beetch review
Fresh On The Net review
Killing Moon review
Drunken Werewolf review
Obscure Sound review
Metaphorical Boat review
Going Solo review
Music for my friends review

English post-rock groups
English rock music groups
Musical groups from London
Musical groups established in 2014